Leonardo Santos (born 2 February 1977) is a Brazilian sailor. He competed in the men's 470 event at the 1996 Summer Olympics.

References

External links
 

1977 births
Living people
Brazilian male sailors (sport)
Olympic sailors of Brazil
Sailors at the 1996 Summer Olympics – 470
Sportspeople from Rio de Janeiro (city)